Aloysius "Al" Mok is an American computer scientist, currently the Quincy Lee Centennial Professor at University of Texas at Austin, and also a published author.

References

Year of birth missing (living people)
Living people
University of Texas at Austin faculty
American computer scientists
Place of birth missing (living people)